Men in White may refer to:

Film and theatre
 Men in White (play), a 1933 drama written by Sidney S. Kingsley 
 Men in White (1934 film), an American drama film
 Men in White (1955 film), a 1955 French drama film
 Men in White (1998 film), a comedy film by National Lampoon Inc
 Men in White (TV series), a Channel 4 television programme
 Men in White (2007 film), a Singaporean comedy film

Other
 Moniker for members of the People's Action Party of Singapore for their traditional party uniform of white shirts and white pants

See also
 Men in Black (disambiguation)
 The Man in White, a 2003 Japanese yakuza film
 The Woman in White (disambiguation)